Africaine (or African, or Africanus), was a barque launched in 1831 at Jarrow on the River Tyne in England. In 1836 she carried immigrants as part of the First Fleet of South Australia. She was wrecked on 23 September 1843.

Career
Africaine first appeared in Lloyd's Register (LR) in 1832 as African, with Thompson, master, Fenwick, owner, and trade London–Quebec.

Africaines next voyage was to Smyrna in what is now Turkey. On 8 April 1833, as she was sailing from Liverpool to Smyrna she grounded on Cape Trafalgar for about three hours. A coaster helped her off, but in doing so carried away her stream anchor and cable. Africaine, Thompson, master, then continued on her voyage on the 9th. 

In 1834 and 1835, under command of John Finlay Duff, Africaine sailed via Calcutta, Mauritius, and Hobart to Sydney.

Robert Gouger and John Brown chartered Africaine in 1836 to carry goods and passengers as part of the First Fleet of South Australia. She departed London Docks on 28 June 1836 and arrived at Holdfast Bay on 8 November 1836. Duff remained the captain, with his new wife on board. Soon after unloading her passengers and cargo at Holdfast Bay, Africaine went on to Hobart Town in Van Diemen's Land (now Tasmania) to acquire more supplies. She arrived in ballast at Launceston on 13 March 1837 from Gulf St. Vincent. She then traded between Hobart and Launceston.

In 1838 her owner became John Griffiths et al., of Launceston. In 1840, under the command of William Dutton, she visited the whaling grounds of New Zealand. Then in November 1841 her owner became James Henty, also of Launceston.

Fate
Africaine was wrecked in a storm on 23 September 1843 with the loss of two of her crew. She was on a voyage from Newcastle to Quebec when she wrecked off Cape St Lawrence, Cape Breton Island. Her entry in LR for 1843 carries the annotation "LOST".

Notes

Citations

History of South Australia
1831 ships
Ships built on the River Tyne
Age of Sail merchant ships of England
Migrant ships to Australia
Maritime incidents in September 1843